Deothang, also known as Dewathang, is a town in south-eastern Bhutan which falls under Samdrup Jongkhar District.  In 2010 it became part of Samdrup Jongkhar municipality (thromde).

Geography 
Dewathang is located in Samdrup Jongkhar District at an altitude of 870 metres (2855 feet). It is 18 km away from the Dzongkhag Administration.The Gewog is bordered by Orong Gewog in the North, Phuntshothang Gewog in the East, Pemagatshel Dzongkhag in the West and Assam in the South.  It consists of 23 villages with 352 households with a total population of 3091.

Institutions 
 Jigme Namgyal Engineering College
 Garpawoong Middle Secondary School
 Dungsam Academy
 Dewathang Primary School
 Rikhey Primary School
 Chokyi Gyatso Institute
 Lhomon Education
 Samdrup Jongkhar Initiative
 Command Center, Royal Bhutan Army
 Dewathang Hospital

Notable People 
 Mingbo Dukpa Minister of education 2013-2016

 Neten Zangmo (Dasho) - Incumbent President of Bhutan Kuen-Nyam Party and Chairperson of the Anti-Corruption Commission of Bhutan 
 Ugyen Chhewang - Auditor General of Bhutan (2005 - 2015)
 Karma Sherab Tobgyal - Thrompon - Samdrup Jongkhar Thromde (2013–present)
 Kezang Dorji - Rapper/Social Worker
 Sangay Lhendup - National Council contestant for Samdrup Jongkhar District 2008 & 2013.

References 

Populated places in Bhutan